Charles Edward Coffin (July 18, 1841 – May 24, 1912), was an American industrialist and Republican politician who moved to Maryland during the American Civil War to operate ironworks near the national capital, and later served in both houses of the Maryland legislature as well as the United States House of Representatives.

Early life and education
Charles Edward Coffin was born in Boston, Massachusetts, descended from numerous long-settled elite New England families.  He attended the Boston grammar and high schools.

Career
In 1863, during the American Civil War, federal authorities hired Coffin to run local ironworks in Muirkirk, Prince George's County, Maryland as well as ensure they did not fall into Confederate hands. The  Muirkirk Foundry Company manufactured pig iron and later upgraded to blast furnaces. Despite his legislative service described below, Coffin served as its president until his death.  After the war many of its laborers were freedmen, who founded an independent black community sometimes known as Rossville (or "Swampoodle"), with its historic black Queen's Chapel and Burial Ground established in 1868.

Coffin first won election to the Maryland House of Delegates in 1884 and served until 1886. In 1890 he won election to the Maryland State Senate, and served from 1890 to 1894. He was a state delegate to the Republican National Convention in 1892.

In 1894, voters from Maryland's 5th congressional district elected Coffin as a Republican to the Fifty-third Congress to fill the vacancy caused by the resignation of Democrat Barnes Compton. He was re-elected to the Fifty-fourth Congress and served from November 6, 1894, to March 3, 1897.

Personal life
He was married to Mary Kate. Together, they had one son and six daughters.

Death
Coffin suffered a stroke in his final years and died in Muirkirk on May 24, 1912. He was interred in St. John's Episcopal Church Cemetery in Beltsville, Maryland.

References

External links

 

1841 births
1912 deaths
Republican Party members of the Maryland House of Delegates
Republican Party Maryland state senators
Republican Party members of the United States House of Representatives from Maryland
People from Prince George's County, Maryland
Politicians from Boston
American industrialists
Businesspeople from Boston
Businesspeople from Maryland
19th-century American businesspeople
20th-century American businesspeople
19th-century American politicians